The 15th Bangladesh National Film Awards, presented by Ministry of Information, Bangladesh to felicitate the best of Bangladeshi Cinema released in 1990. The ceremony took place in Dhaka and awards were given by then President of Bangladesh. The National Film Awards are the only film awards given by the government itself. Every year, a national panel appointed by the government selects the winning entry, and the award ceremony is held in Dhaka. 1990 was the 15th ceremony of National Film Awards.

List of winners
This year awards were given in 18 categories.

Merit Awards

Technical Awards

Special Awards
 Best Child Artist (Special) - Master Dodul for ?

See also
Bachsas Awards
Meril Prothom Alo Awards
Ifad Film Club Award
Babisas Award

References

External links

National Film Awards (Bangladesh) ceremonies
1990  film awards
1990 awards in Bangladesh
1990 in Dhaka